For the Summer Olympics, a total of 50 venues starting with the letter 'P'.

References

 List P